= Mike Ocasio =

Puerto Rican artist

Mike Ocasio (born Michael Ocasio Arana) is a New York-based creative director, illustrator and figure artist. He is the lead illustrator for the children's book "The Pumpkin and the Pantsuit". Michael was born in San Juan, Puerto Rico.
